Charles Haire may refer to:

 Charles Haire (Florida politician), first Intendant (position that preceded the office of mayor) of Tallahassee, Florida, United States (mayors of Tallahassee)
 Charles S. Haire, an architect in Montana, United States, who was a partner in Link & Haire